Naumanullah (born 20 May 1975) is a Pakistani cricketer. He is a right-handed batsman and occasional right-arm off-spin bowler.

Having made his first-class debut for Hyderabad in 1995, he has represented the various teams of neighbouring Karachi in regional cricket since 1998, as well as National Bank of Pakistan and Redco Pakistan Limited. Playing for National Bank of Pakistan, he was named best batsman in the 2007–08 Quaid-e-Azam Trophy.

Naumanullah first played for Pakistan A in 2000, before making his One Day International debut against Bangladesh in 2008. He scored five runs in a 150-run victory.

References

External links

1975 births
Living people
Pakistan One Day International cricketers
Karachi cricketers
National Bank of Pakistan cricketers
Redco Pakistan Limited cricketers
Pakistani cricketers
Cricketers from Karachi
Hyderabad (Pakistan) cricketers
Karachi Blues cricketers
Karachi Urban cricketers
Karachi Whites cricketers
Sindh cricketers
Karachi Dolphins cricketers
Karachi Zebras cricketers